Sušica is a village in the municipality of Novo Selo, North Macedonia.

Demographics
According to the 2002 census, the village had a total of 1,811 inhabitants. Ethnic groups in the village include:

Macedonians 1,808
Serbs 2
Others 1

Sports
Local football club FK Nov Milenium ceased to exist in 2008.

References

Villages in Novo Selo Municipality